Krzysztof Walencik (born 26 February 1965) is a Polish wrestler. He competed in the men's freestyle 74 kg at the 1992 Summer Olympics.

References

External links
 

1965 births
Living people
Polish male sport wrestlers
Olympic wrestlers of Poland
Wrestlers at the 1992 Summer Olympics
People from Sochaczew